Buerton is a civil parish in Cheshire East, England. It contains twelve buildings that are recorded in the National Heritage List for England as designated listed buildings.  Of these, one is listed at Grade I, the highest grade, one is listed at Grade II*, the middle grade, and the others are at Grade II.  Apart from the village of Buerton, the parish is rural.  The listed buildings consist of houses and associated structures, farmhouses and farm buildings, and a former windmill.

Key

Buildings

References
Citations

Sources

 

Listed buildings in the Borough of Cheshire East
Lists of listed buildings in Cheshire